Lost Dog or Lost Dogs may refer to:

a lost pet, see Animal loss
Lost Dog Creek, a steam in South Dakota
Lost Dogs, a band
"Lost Dog" (episode), a live-action episode in The Super Mario Bros. Super Show!
Lost Dogs (album), an album by Pearl Jam
The Lost Dog, a 2007 novel